The 1998 Jacksonville Dolphins football team represented Jacksonville University as an independent during the 1998 NCAA Division I-AA football season. This was the first year in which Jacksonville fielded a football team. Led by first-year head coach Steve Gilbert, the Dolphins compiled a record of 4–5. Jacksonville played their home games at D. B. Milne Field in Jacksonville, Florida

Schedule

References

Jacksonville
Jacksonville Dolphins football seasons
Jacksonville Dolphins football